Cancer Bats  was the first EP by the band Cancer Bats. It was produced and engineered by Cancer Bats' guitarist Scott Middleton. This EP was sold at all the live shows leading up until the release of Cancer Bats' first album Birthing the Giant and later repressed as a 7" record by Tragicomedy Records.

Track listing
Bloodpact – 3:02
Shillelagh – 3:20
Ragin' Hard – 2:35
Technolokron – 1:38

References

Cancer Bats albums
2005 debut EPs
Self-released EPs